The 2021–22 season is Ratchaburi Mitr Phol Football Club's 15th existence. It is the 6th season in the Thai League and the club's 9th consecutive season in the top flight of the Thai football league system since promoted in the 2013 season. Also, having finished 4th in the first half of 2020-21 Thai League 1, Ratchaburi Mitr Phol Football Club are qualified for the play-off stage of the 2021 AFC Champions League for the first time in the club's history, but after Jiangsu ceased operation, Ratchaburi Mitr Phol automatically qualified to the group stage instead alongside Pohang Steelers. In this season,  Ratchaburi Mitr Phol participates in 4 competitions which consisted of the Thai League, FA Cup, League Cup, and AFC Champions League.

2021–22 Thai League 1 season was supposed to start on 31 July 2021 and concluded on 21 May 2022. Then, due to the situation of the COVID-19 pandemic is still severe, FA Thailand decided to postpone the season to start on 13 August 2021 instead. However, as it stands on 23 July 2021, the COVID-19's situation is getting even worse. Therefore, FA Thailand decided to postpone the opening day for the second time to start on 3 September 2021.

Squad

Transfer

Pre-season transfer

In

Loan In

Out

Loan Out

Mid-season transfer

In

Loan In

Out

Loan Out

Competitions

Overview

Thai League 1

League table

Results summary

Results by matchday

Matches

Thai FA Cup

Matches

Thai League Cup

Matches

AFC Champions League

Group table

Matches

Team statistics

Appearances and goals

Overall summary

Season summary

Score overview

Notes

References 

RAT
Ratchaburi Mitr Phol F.C. seasons